TV24  is a free-to-air 24-hour national Hindi news television channel owned by A-One NewsTime Broadcasting Pvt. Ltd.

Network availability
News World India is available in following networks.

Tata Sky
Independent TV
Netvision

See also 
List of television stations in India

References

24-hour television news channels in India
Hindi-language television channels in India
Hindi-language television stations